Ruth Peabody (March 30, 1893 – October 22, 1966) was an American painter. Her work was part of the painting event in the art competition at the 1932 Summer Olympics.

References

1893 births
1966 deaths
20th-century American painters
American women painters
Olympic competitors in art competitions
People from Highland Park, Illinois
20th-century American women artists